Spirit Sensitive is a hard-bop jazz album by Chico Freeman on India Navigation Records IN 1045.

The LP, in contrast to many of his more avant-garde recordings of the same time frame, is a set that consists of jazz standards.

Criticism
Jazz critic Scott Yanow wrote: “…a change of pace for Freeman, for it features the usually adventurous tenor (who doubles on soprano) mostly playing warm versions of standards.” The Rolling Stone Jazz Record Guide called it an "exquisite ballad album... where Freeman blows standards with more invention and conviction than most old-timers"

Track listing
"Autumn in New York" (Vernon Duke) – 11:28
"Peace" (Horace Silver)– 7:53
"A Child Is Born" (Thad Jones) – 9:56
"It Never Entered My Mind" (Rodgers and Hart) – 11:04
"Close to You Alone" – (Cecil McBee)
"Don't Get Around Much Anymore " – (Duke Ellington, Bob Russell)

Reissues
An audio CD of the album was released on September 5, 1994, by Analogue Productions, with four bonus tracks, two of them written by John Coltrane (“Lonnie’s Lament” and “Wise One”) and a running time of 63:18. In 1994, there was also a U.S. limited edition audiophile 6-track LP pressed on HQ-180 super vinyl.

Personnel
Chico Freeman -  tenor saxophone, soprano saxophone
Cecil McBee – bass
John Hicks – piano
Billy Hart - drums
Famoudou Don Moye - drums

Production
India Navigation
Cover and liner photos: Beth Cummins

References

Chico Freeman albums
1979 albums
India Navigation albums